Holiša is a village and municipality in the Lučenec District in the Banská Bystrica Region of Slovakia.

History
In historical records, the village was first mentioned in 1246. It belonged to local nobles Lossonczy. From 1554 to 1594 it was occupied by Turks, and after it passed to Forgách, Koháry and Coburg. A castle had existed in the village until the 15th century. From 1938 to 1945 it belonged to Hungary.

Genealogical resources

The records for genealogical research are available at the state archive "Statny Archiv in Banska Bystrica, Slovakia"

 Roman Catholic church records (births/marriages/deaths): 1773-1892 (parish A)
 Lutheran church records (births/marriages/deaths): 1783-1895 (parish B)

See also
 List of municipalities and towns in Slovakia

External links
https://web.archive.org/web/20081026090138/http://www.holisa.ocu.sk/index.html
https://web.archive.org/web/20080111223415/http://www.statistics.sk/mosmis/eng/run.html
http://www.e-obce.sk/obec/holisa/holisa.html

Surnames of living people in Holisa

Villages and municipalities in Lučenec District